Fall, I Will Follow is the fifth album by the German band Lacrimas Profundere.

Track listing

References

Lacrimas Profundere albums
2003 albums
Napalm Records albums
Albums with cover art by Travis Smith (artist)